Batman Begins is a stealth action-adventure game based on the film of the same name. It was released on June 14, 2005 for the Game Boy Advance, GameCube, PlayStation 2 and Xbox; a day before the release of the film. The game was developed by Eurocom and published by Electronic Arts in conjunction with Warner Bros. Interactive Entertainment and DC Comics. The film's original cast provided a voice-over reprisal in the game, with the exception of Gary Oldman, who portrays James Gordon in the film and was replaced by Gavin Hammon in the game.

The game received mixed reviews upon release. A PlayStation Portable version was planned, but subsequently cancelled for unknown reasons. A sequel, Batman: The Dark Knight, based on the 2008 film of the same name, was developed for the PlayStation 3 and Xbox 360, but ultimately got cancelled as well.

Gameplay
Batman Begins is an action-adventure game incorporating both beat 'em up and stealth elements. The player controls Batman from a third-person perspective, who has access to several gadgets that can be put to good use during both combat and stealth segments. These include batarangs, smoke grenades, flash bang grenades, and an 'HF Transponder', which summons bats to gather around and incapacitate enemies with "fear" (a gameplay mechanic unique to this game). During stealth segments, the player can interact with the environment to create various circumstances that scare off enemies, such as explosions or dropping crates near them, making them easier to subdue. Fear also plays a role in the combat segments, where, if the fear bar is filled, it allows the player to finish off the last remaining enemy with a single hit. The overall stealth gameplay is reminiscent of the Splinter Cell series.

Aside from the combat and stealth segments, the game also incorporates several combat racing sections where the player drives the Tumbler. The game features several alternate costumes for Batman to wear, which are unlocked after completing the main story. Aside from the story, there is a "Gallery of Fear", where the player can view various enemies and villains they have encountered throughout the game and read their bios.

Synopsis
The game closely follows the film's plot, albeit with minor modifications, such as the introduction of scenes absent from the film, or expanding upon certain events depicted in the film. The game features over 20 clips from the film that serve as in-game cutscenes between levels and help the player to better understand the story.

Plot 
Inside a run-down building full of explosives in Gotham City, Batman confronts a group of thugs working for Dr. Johnathan Crane. The explosives are accidentally triggered during the fight, setting the building on fire. Batman makes his way through the inferno and catches Crane, but he sprays him with some gas, causing Batman to go psychotic and jump out of a window. The game then flashes back to a year ago in the Himalayas, during Bruce Wayne's training with Henri Ducard and the League of Shadows, led by Ra's al Ghul. When the League tasks Bruce with executing a criminal to complete his training, he refuses to do so. Upon learning the League intends to destroy Gotham, which they believe is beyond saving, Bruce burns their temple down, and narrowly escapes with Ducard, leaving Ra's and the rest of the League to die in the fire.

After parting ways with Ducard, Bruce returns to Gotham and intends to fight crime. He sets up a base in the caves beneath Wayne Manor and becomes the vigilante Batman, inspired by his childhood fear of bats. He is aided in his crusade by his longtime butler Alfred and Wayne Enterprises archivist Lucius, who supplies him with advanced technology. Bruce keeps his Batman identity secret from everyone else including Rachel Dawes, his childhood sweetheart. A week prior to the game's opening sequence, learning that mob boss Carmine Falcone is involved with a drug shipment at the Gotham Docks, Batman captures him and leaves him for the GCPD to find. He then informs Rachel of the shipment, and provides her with enough evidence to enlist Sergeant James Gordon, one of Gotham's few honest cops, to arrest Falcone.

Bruce is informed by Lucius of the theft of a microwave emitter from Wayne Enterprises, and pursues the thieves in his Tumbler, but discovers they used a decoy to lure him away. Putting that issue aside, Batman seeks to learn more about Falcone's ongoing drug operation and his associates. He tracks down Gordon's crooked partner Arnold Flass as he attempts to blackmail psychotic serial killer Victor Zsasz into telling him about Crane, Falcone's new partner. Batman catches Flass and threatens him into revealing that besides drugs, Falcone's men are shipping some chemicals to Crane, who works at Arkham Asylum. Batman subsequently intercepts the shipment, and follows the helicopter used to transport it to Crane, leading to the game's opening sequence.

Lucius develops an antidote and cures Bruce of the gas sprayed on him, which he learns is a dose of toxin made by Crane which induces horrifying hallucinations and irrational fear. Meanwhile, Rachel seeks to investigate the connection between Crane and Falcone, who was previously transferred to the facility after being drugged with the toxin by Crane. She enters Arkham to question Crane, but ends up being drugged as well and held captive. Batman infiltrates Arkham and learns that Crane has introduced his toxin into Gotham's water supply. However, Crane discovers His presence and calls the GCPD to arrest him. As the police storm Arkham, Batman confronts Crane and interrogates him after exposing him to his own toxin, learning he works for Ra's al Ghul. Leaving Crane to be arrested, Batman speaks with Gordon and convinces him to help him get Rachel, who is dying from the toxin, to safety. After sneaking out of the asylum and avoiding the pursuing police, Batman takes Rachel to the Batcave, where he manages to save her life, but opts to keep his identity secret from her for her safety.

Later, during his birthday party at Wayne Manor, Bruce is confronted by surviving members of the League of Shadows, led by Ducard, who reveals himself as the true Ra's Al Ghul, and informs him of his plan to destroy Gotham by vaporizing its water supply using the stolen microwave emitter, which will render Crane's toxin airborne and cause mass hysteria. As the League sets the manor on fire, Bruce rescues Lucius and escapes with Alfred to the Batcave. Meanwhile, a prison riot occurs at Arkham, and numerous inmates escape onto the streets of Narrows Island, where they become violent after being exposed to Crane's toxin. Amidst the chaos, Batman confronts Crane and stops him from leading the criminals into Gotham. Crane is again exposed to his toxin and hallucinates Batman as a monster, causing him to jump into the river in fear.

Batman shifts focus towards stopping the League, after Ra's loads the microwave emitter onto Gotham's monorail train to transport it to the city's central water hub. He is helped by Rachel, who tries to stop the train at the monorail control station, until Zsasz attacks her. Batman rescues Rachel, indirectly revealing his identity to her in the process, and then boards the train in hopes of deactivating the microwave emitter. After defeating Ra's, he discovers the device cannot be shut down, so he detonates the Tumbler to destroy the track and prevent the train from reaching the heart of Gotham. Batman refuses to kill Ra's but chooses not to save him either, leaving the train before it crashes, killing Ra's.

Later, as Gotham slowly returns to normal, Bruce accepts his new responsibility as Batman.

Voice cast 
Christian Bale as Bruce Wayne/Batman
Michael Caine as Alfred Pennyworth
Liam Neeson as Henri Ducard/Ra's al Ghul
Katie Holmes as Rachel Dawes
Gavin Hammon as Sergeant James Gordon
Cillian Murphy as Dr. Jonathan Crane/The Scarecrow
Tom Wilkinson as Carmine Falcone
Morgan Freeman as Lucius Fox
Tim Booth as Victor Zsasz
Mark Boone Junior as Detective Arnold Flass
Ken Watanabe as Ra's al Ghul (decoy)
Batman Begins producer Emma Thomas and cinematographer Wally Pfister make cameo appearances in the game as an Arkham Asylum doctor and a Falcone mobster, respectively.

Reception

Reviews of the game found it generally average. GameRankings gave it a score of 62.14% for the Game Boy Advance version, 66.74% for the GameCube version, 65.63% for the PlayStation 2 version, and 67.20% for the Xbox version. Likewise, Metacritic gave it a score of 61 out of 100 for the GBA version, 66 out of 100 for the GameCube version, 64 out of 100 for the PS2 version, and 65 out of 100 for the Xbox version. It received G4's award for 'Best Graphics on PS2 and Xbox'.

The game sold 587,000 copies.

Cancelled sequel 
On July 17, 2008, actor Gary Oldman said during an interview with G4's Kristin Adams that a video game sequel of the Batman Begins video game based on the second film of the franchise was in development. In his interview on GameTrailers, Oldman said he knew an awful lot of effort had gone into getting Batman's gliding abilities to feel suitably smooth and fluid for Batman: The Dark Knight game. Oldman, who reprised his role as Lt. Jim Gordon, did not name a developer in the interview but anonymous sources reported that The Dark Knight was a secret project of Pandemic Studios and EA. However, the project was cancelled and Pandemic Brisbane was shut down.

References

External links

Batman Begins at Eurocom
Batman Begins at Electronic Arts

2005 video games
Action-adventure games
Cancelled PlayStation Portable games
Cancelled Nintendo DS games
Eurocom games
Video games based on Batman films
Game Boy Advance games
GameCube games
PlayStation 2 games
Stealth video games
Xbox games
Video games about chemical war and weapons
Video games about terrorism
Video games based on films
Video games based on adaptations
Video games based on works by Christopher Nolan
Video games based on works by David S. Goyer
Video games developed in the United Kingdom
Video games set in psychiatric hospitals
Detective video games
The Dark Knight Trilogy
Superhero video games
Vicarious Visions games
Single-player video games
Electronic Arts games
Video games set in the United States
Video games set in Asia
Video games developed in the United States